The 1913 Dover by-election was held on 23 June 1913.  The by-election was held due to the death of the incumbent Conservative MP, George Wyndham.  It was won by the Conservative candidate Vere Ponsonby, who was unopposed.  Ponsonby would later become ninth Earl of Bessborough.

References

1913 in England
Dover District
1913 elections in the United Kingdom
By-elections to the Parliament of the United Kingdom in Kent constituencies
Unopposed by-elections to the Parliament of the United Kingdom (need citation)
1910s in Kent
History of Dover, Kent